Bosentino (Bosentin or Bosentim in local dialect) is a comune (municipality) in Trentino in the northern Italian region Trentino-Alto Adige/Südtirol, located about  southeast of Trento.

The municipality of Bosentino contains the frazione (subdivision) Migazzone.

Bosentino borders the following municipalities: Pergine Valsugana, Vigolo Vattaro, Caldonazzo, Calceranica al Lago, Vattaro, and Besenello.

Demographic evolution

References

Cities and towns in Trentino-Alto Adige/Südtirol